The Emirates Literature Foundation, the home of the Emirates Airline Festival of Literature, is a literature organization in the United Arab Emirates.

It was established in 2013 by a royal decree issued by Sheikh Mohammed bin Rashid Al Maktoum, Vice President and Prime Minister of the United Arab Emirates and Ruler of Dubai. The literature foundation is formed with a total capital of Dh18.7 million.

References

Organisations based in Dubai
Organizations established in 2013
Emirati literature
2013 establishments in the United Arab Emirates